Iglesias is a Spanish surname, meaning "churches".

Notables with this name include
 The Iglesias family of Spain
 Julio Iglesias Sr. (1915–2005), gynecologist, father of Julio
 Julio Iglesias (born 1943) singer, father of:
 Chabeli Iglesias (born 1971), journalist, sister of Enrique and Julio José
 Julio Iglesias Jr. (born 1973), pop singer and model
 Enrique Iglesias (born 1975), musician
 Alberto Iglesias (born 1955), Spanish composer
 Enrique V. Iglesias (born 1931), Uruguayan economist
 Gabriel Iglesias (born 1976), American actor and comedian
 Gabriëlle Andrée Iglesias Velayos y Taliaferro (1933–2010), French landscape architect and garden writer, also a Dutch baroness
 Pablo Iglesias Simón (born 1977), Spanish theatre director, playwright, researcher, sound designer, and professor.

Political figures 
 Dalmacio Iglesias García (1879–1933), Spanish Carlist politician
 David Iglesias (attorney) (born 1955), American attorney, U.S. Attorney for New Mexico 2002-06
 Fernando Iglesias (Argentine politician), Argentine writer and deputee
 José María Iglesias (1823–1891), Mexican lawyer, professor, journalist and liberal politician. Disputed 28th President of Mexico.
 Miguel Iglesias (1830–1909), Peruvian soldier, politician and president 1883-5.
 Pablo Iglesias Posse (1850–1925), Spanish socialist politician
 Pablo Iglesias Turrión (born 1978), Spanish politician and Secretary-General of Podemos
 Santiago Iglesias (1872–1939), Puerto Rican political activist, labor organiser and newspaper publisher

Sports figures 
 David Cobeño Iglesias (born 1982), Spanish footballer
 José Iglesias (baseball), Cuban baseball player for the Cincinnati Reds
 Leonardo Andrés Iglesias (born 1979), Argentinian footballer
 Raisel Iglesias, Cuban baseball player for the Cincinnati Reds
 Roniel Iglesias (born 1988), Cuban amateur boxer, Olympics medalist winner
 Borja Iglesias (born 1993), Spanish footballer

See also
Yglesias

References

Spanish-language surnames